Daniel Patrick Trant (May 15, 1961 – September 11, 2001) was an American basketball player and Cantor Fitzgerald bond trader killed in the September 11, 2001 terrorist attacks at the North Tower of World Trade Center in New York City. He grew up in Westfield, Massachusetts, and graduated from Westfield High School.

Trant was drafted in the 10th round and was the 228th and last pick in the 1984 NBA draft.  He was part of the 1984–85 Boston Celtics season.  Trant attended Clark University.

References

1961 births
2001 deaths
American men's basketball players
American terrorism victims
Basketball players from Massachusetts
Boston Celtics draft picks
Clark Cougars men's basketball players
Male murder victims
People murdered in New York City
Terrorism deaths in New York (state)
Victims of the September 11 attacks
Cantor Fitzgerald
People from Westfield, Massachusetts